Johan Teng may refer to:
 , Swedish painter
 Johan Teng (politician) (1895–1979), Estonian politician